Parani is an industrial Bluetooth product line from Sena Technologies Inc. Parani consists of four categories: Bluetooth Serial Adapter, OEM Bluetooth Serial Module, Industrial Bluetooth Access Point, Bluetooth USB Adapter. Bluetooth Serial products incorporate advanced features such as Bluetooth 1.2/2.0 Protocol Stack that includes Adaptive Frequency-hopping spread spectrum (AFH)

Bluetooth Serial Adapter 

Bluetooth Serial Adapter replaces RS232/422/485 serial cables with wireless connection with Bluetooth 1.2/2.0 Protocol Stack.
Supporting data transfer speeds up to 230 kbit/s, these Bluetooth serial adapter products are often used for industrial applications that require data logging, wireless sensor control and monitoring in production facilities. Also in medical applications, physicians with hand held devices are able to view and update medical databases and patient's charts instantly reducing redundant paper work, increasing efficiency and lowering hospital costs.
Other possible applications are retail POS, bar code scanners and credit card readers, restaurant order and receipt printers, security systems, gas pumps, and outdoor sign boards.

Parani Products

OEM Bluetooth Serial Module 

OEM Bluetooth Serial Module is a chip to embed Bluetooth connection directly onto the circuit boards of RS232 based equipment. Bluetooth Serial Module can be connected to the device via built-in UART interface and communicate with other Bluetooth enabled devices such as mobile phones, handheld computers and laptops.

Parani Products

Industrial Bluetooth Access Point 

Bluetooth Access Point product line is designed to connect up to 28 Bluetooth devices to the 10/100 Base-T Ethernet network. These Bluetooth Access Points transmit data from each Bluetooth terminal to management station via TCP/IP. They are designed for large-scale wireless installations especially in industrial, medical, and retail/POS sectors.

Parani Products

Bluetooth USB Adapter 

Bluetooth USB Adapter is a class 1 type Bluetooth product that supports 300 meters of wireless transmission distance by default. It is often used for industrial or special applications.

Parani Products

External links 
 Official Sena Technologies Inc. Webpage
 Youtube page for SENA's Industrial products

Notes and references 

Bluetooth